known in North America as Number Battle, is a puzzle/strategy video game developed by Mitchell Corporation for the Nintendo DS handheld video game console. By the end of 2007, Sujin Taisen sold 21,996 copies.

It was later announced to be coming to the Nintendo DSi's DSiWare digital distribution service on January 26, 2009 under the title . It was released two days later.

Gameplay
Sujin Taisen plays similarly to a game of dominoes, and is controlled with the Nintendo DS' touchscreen. In each round, the player places a tile on the game board which ranges from 1.5, also featuring paths on them. The object of the game is to place the tiles on the board so that the paths join and the numbers create sequences, which are called "hands". A path on a tile can either be one-way, meaning it emerges from the center number at one side of the piece; two-way, meaning it runs through the tile, either straight through or turning in the middle; three-way, in the shape of a "T"; or four-way, in the shape of a cross. There are four kinds of hands the player can make, two for number sequences and two for path sequences. The number sequences include Sequence Join, which is done by joining the paths of adjacent pieces so that the numbers run in order, and Same Number Join, which is done by joining the path of adjacent numbers with the same number. The path sequences include Enclosure Join, which is done by joining the path of adjacent pieces to create a loop, and Complete Join, which is done by joining paths so that both ends are ended with a one-way path. Sujin Taisen features online play through the Nintendo Wi-Fi Connection between two and four players, as well as a Vs. Computer mode.

Advanced play strategy revolves around laying the tiles in clever ways so as to score multiple hands with a tile, as well as blocking the opponent from doing the same with items and one's own tiles.

Development
Sujin Taisen was released on June 7, 2007 for the Nintendo DS. It was developed by Mitchell and published by Nintendo. A DSiWare version of it was announced on January 26, 2009 under the title Chotto Sujin Taisen, and was released two days later.

DSiWare version
 Sujin Taisen was re-released as Sujin Taisen Number Battles for the Nintendo DSi's DSiWare on January 28, 2009. It retains the Story, Puzzle and Online Multi-player (Nintendo Wi-Fi Connection) modes found in the Nintendo DS release, but loses the Local Multi-Player and DS Download Play modes. The DSiWare version was later released in Europe and North America.

Reception
Sujin Taisen was the 471st best-selling video game of 2007, selling 21,996 copies. Four reviewers for Famitsu gave Sujin Taisen straight 7s, for a total score of 28/40.

In their second set of impressions for the DSiWare games, IGN commented that while the gameplay was difficult at first, after they learned the ins and outs of it by trial and error, they found it fun and very addictive. They also praised it for its visuals and sound. IGN called the DSiWare version another great "mini" version of a Nintendo DS game, commenting that they came into this title totally fresh, not knowing the game at all, how to navigate the menus, how to play the game at all, or a lick of Japanese. Despite this, they said that they would recommend even non-Japanese players to download this game. IGN also commented that players should buy the game if they can get over suffering through some menus and an all-Japanese tutorial, adding that it is a great download for its price.

Legacy
The old master character, Hsien, would be featured as one of the spirits in Super Smash Bros. Ultimate.

Notes

References

External links
Official Japanese website for Chotto Sujin Taisen
Official Japanese website for Sujin Taisen
Official English website for Sujin Taisen: Number Battles
Official American website for Number Battle 

2007 video games
Nintendo DS games
Nintendo DS-only games
Nintendo games
DSiWare games
Nintendo Wi-Fi Connection games
Puzzle video games
Strategy video games
Video games developed in Japan